InPhonex  is a telecommunications firm offering telephony services in more than 150 countries. Miami-based InPhonex serves communications service providers, businesses of all sizes, Managed Service Providers (MSPs), value-added resellers (VARs) and consumers, under its own and other brands.  Offerings include unified communications (UCaaS), web and mobile applications, services and utilities, such as business phone service, VoIP, hosted PBX, SIP trunking, product creation and provisioning.

History 
InPhonex was created in 2003 by Bill Nesbitt and Kooi Lim to capitalize on the opportunity to spread the revolution of VoIP communications technology.  Nesbitt founded Hiway Technologies, which was acquired by Verio in 1998 for $400 million. Lim founded Superclone, which sold more than $150 million in computers and computer components from 1988 to 2004. In 1996 Lim also founded KCL.net, an ISP that provides hosting, collocation, and broadband services to businesses and consumers.

In order to build out the organization, Nesbitt and Lim brought in Todd Hirshorn in 2004. Hirshorn was a previous colleague of Nesbitt at Hiway and founder of Mednetrix, a web technology provider to the medical industry sold to WebMd in 2000. Hirshorn created VarPhonex to provide private label VoIP services leveraging the InPhonex technology . VarPhonex enables resellers to sell SIP Termination, SIP Trunking, International DID numbers and other VoIP services under their brand name.

In 2009 VarPhonex Partner Solutions was launched to service the needs of application service providers and high-volume distribution channels.

In 2015, InPhonex launched its UCaaS solution and rebranded the company as RingByName. RingByName is an open platform and supports All SIP compatible IP phones.

RingByName offers platform as a service (PaaS) to enable other providers who wish to offer UCaaS under their own brand.

See also
 VoIP
 Internet Telephony Service Provider

References 

Telecommunications companies established in 2003
Telecommunications companies of the United States
VoIP companies of the United States
2003 establishments in Florida
Companies based in Miami